This is a list of airlines of the Americas, in operation.

List of airlines

Anguilla
Anguilla Air Services
Trans Anguilla Airways

Antigua and Barbuda

Archipelago of San Andrés, Providencia and Santa Catalina
The Archipelago of San Andrés, Providencia and Santa Catalina has no active airlines.

Argentina

Aruba

Bahamas

Barbados
Barbados has no active airlines.

Belize

Bermuda

Bolivia

Bonaire
EZ AIR
Divi Divi Air

Bouvet Island
Bouvet Island has no active airlines.

Brazil

British Virgin Islands

Canada

Cayman Islands

Chile

Clipperton Island
Clipperton Island has no active airlines

Colombia

Costa Rica

Cuba

Curaçao
Divi Divi Air
Dutch Caribbean Islandhopper
Jetair Caribbean

Dominica
Dominica has no active airlines.

Dominican Republic

Ecuador

El Salvador

Falkland Islands

French Guiana
Air Guyane Express

Federal Dependencies of Venezuela
The Federal Dependencies of Venezuela has no active airlines.

Greenland

Grenada
Grenada has no active airlines.

Guadeloupe
Air Antilles Express
Air Caraïbes
Air Saint Martin

Guatemala

Guyana

Haiti

Honduras

Jamaica

Martinique
Air Caraïbes
Take Air

Mexico

Montserrat

Navassa Island
Navassa Island has no active airlines.

Nicaragua

Nueva Esparta
Nueva Esparta has no active airlines.

Panama

Paraguay

Peru

Puerto Rico

Saba
 has no active airlines.

Saint Barthélemy
St Barth Commuter

Saint Kitts and Nevis
Saint Kitts and Nevis has no active airlines.

Saint Lucia
Saint Lucia has no active airlines.

Saint Martin
Saint Martin has no active airlines.

Saint Pierre and Miquelon

Saint Vincent and the Grenadines

Sint Eustatius
Sint Eustatius has no active airlines.

Sint Maarten
Winair
Windward Express

South Georgia and the South Sandwich Islands
South Georgia and the South Sandwich Islands has no active airlines.

Suriname

Trinidad and Tobago

Turks and Caicos Islands

United States of America

United States Virgin Islands

Uruguay

Venezuela

See also

 List of airlines
 List of defunct airlines of the Americas

References

Airlines of the Americas
Lists of airlines of the Americas